is a private junior college in Hachiōji, Tokyo, Japan. It was established as women's college in 1965, and became coeducational in 1998.

Notable alumni
 Yoko Hoshi (born 1966) Japanese actress

See also
 Teikyo University

External links
  

Educational institutions established in 1965
Private universities and colleges in Japan
Japanese junior colleges
Universities and colleges in Tokyo
1965 establishments in Japan